Death Hollow, Death Canyon or Little Death Hollow is a slot canyon in the Grand Staircase–Escalante National Monument in central Garfield County, Utah, United States.

It is located on the East side of the Escalante River southeast of the town of Escalante, Utah. Not to be confused with the much longer and deeper Death Hollow upstream and directly to the east of the town.

Description
The  canyon is located southeast of the town of Boulder and is popular with hikers. It is a side canyon of Horse Canyon, which continues on to the Escalante River.

See also

 List of canyons and gorges in Utah
 Canyons of the Escalante

References

External links

 Little Death Hollow - Utah.com

Canyons and gorges of Utah
Canyons and gorges of Garfield County, Utah
Grand Staircase–Escalante National Monument